Joan of Arc, a French historical figure executed by the English for heresy in 1431, is a national heroine of France and a Roman Catholic saint. Joan accompanied an army during the Hundred Years War, adopting the clothing of a soldier, which ultimately provided a pretense for her conviction and execution. Whether her crossdressing and lifestyle have implications for her sexuality or gender identity is debated.

Background

Kelly DeVries notes that, "No person of the Middle Ages, male or female, has been the subject of more study than Joan of Arc. She has been portrayed as saint, heretic, religious zealot, seer, demented teenager, proto-feminist, aristocratic wanna-be, savior of France, person who turned the tide of the Hundred Years War and even Marxist liberator."

After her capture during the siege of Compiègne while retreating from a failed attack at Margny, Joan was handed over to the English by the Burgundians, imprisoned, and subsequently put on trial for heresy. Despite the attempts by the judges to induce her to repent for her wearing of male attire, Joan repeatedly defended the wearing of this clothing as a "small matter" that was "the commandment of God and his angels". As Pernoud and Clin note, "Other questions about her mode of dress provoked only repetitions of these answers: She had done nothing that was not by the commandment of God. Probably not even Cauchon could then have guessed the importance that her mode of dress would come to assume."

Joan signed a cedula, possibly without understanding the text, indicating that she would no longer wear soldier's clothing, only to "relapse" later by again wearing this clothing after being given the clothing back by the very captors who demanded the signing of the cedula in the first place, thereby giving the court justification to have her executed ("Only those who had relapsed – that is, those who having once adjured their errors returned to them – could be condemned to death by a tribunal of the Inquisition and delivered for death"). On May 30, 1431, Joan of Arc was burned at the stake.

Historical context

Life and society in the late Middle Ages was heavily dominated by the teachings of the Catholic Church. Concerning crossdressing, Deuteronomy 22:5, which states, "The woman shall not wear that which pertaineth unto a man", made crossdressing anathema. On the other hand, there were the guidelines of St. Thomas Aquinas, who wrote that "it is in itself sinful for a woman to wear man's clothes, or vice versa; especially since this may be a cause of sensuous pleasure ... Nevertheless this may be done sometimes without sin on account of some necessity, either in order to hide oneself from enemies, or through lack of other clothes, or for some similar motive", thus giving some leeway to whether crossdressing is justifiable under church law in certain circumstances. Susan Schibanoff states that, in modern terms, what church doctrine permitted and what medieval society in general would accept is not merely cross dressing, as partial or episodic transvestment where the subject's biological sexual identity remains apparent, but passing, where the subject adopts all aspects of the target gender. The condemned were not those who wished to "better" themselves by becoming male, like the female saints, but those who "wear the breeches" or, as Chaucer's Wife of Bath, put on the spurs, but otherwise remain recognizably female.

Vern and Bonnie Bullough comment that despite the specific canons against it, one might search the church fathers in vain for overt and unconditional approbations on transvestism. On the contrary, Susan Schibanoff notes that "one version of transvestism appears to have been both admired and encouraged, albeit indirectly, in the legends of female saints who disguised themselves as men to live as monks". As a consequence, Joan's accusers were forced to carefully frame their accusations that Joan retained "nothing about her to display and announce her sex, save Nature's own distinctive marks". That is, unlike the holy transvestites, who totally disguised their sex, Joan had not concealed her anatomy or other "marks" of her biological femininity.

The "holy transvestite" – i.e., transvestite female saint – was a common medieval archetype, and one of the grounds used to defend Joan's attire. Saint Marina followed the classic story: fearing for her virginity on her wedding night, she cut off her hair, donned male attire, and joined a monastery, passing herself off as "Father Marinos". The devil tested her by framing her for the pregnancy of an innkeeper’s daughter, and she was driven into exile. She was absolved of all guilt after she died.

With regard to the holy transvestites, Gaunt argues that "Sexuality is central to the construction of sanctity in the Middle Ages", and that holy men and women are not removed from sexuality, but continue to define themselves through reference to sexuality that has been reshaped and redirected. Gaunt agrees with Anson in the description of these stories as "monastic fantasy" that attempts to appease sexual longing by imagining a woman in the monastery who need not inspire guilt; however, the appeasing of the longing is complexly gendered by the apparent masculinity of the subject.

15th-century Europe possessed a significant cultural lore of such saints extending back nearly as far as the history of Christianity. Saint Thecla, sourced from the New Testament Apocrypha The "Acts of Paul and Thecla", was so enraptured with the teachings of Paul that she left her fiance and followed him, dressing as a man part of the time while in his retinue. Thecla's story was very popular and widespread, with depictions of her and dedications ranging from Antioch to Iberia. According to Dekker and van de Pol, "The transformation into a man was a very dominant theme with female saints from the fifth to the seventh century. Saint Margaret, for example, escaped on her wedding night in men's clothes. ... A saint especially popular among the common people in Europe from the eleventh century on ... was Saint Uncumber. She was a Portuguese princess who refused to be married to the heathen King of Sicily, and prayed to God to be saved from this fate. Her salvation was unusual; she suddenly grew a beard. Variations on this theme recur more often ... As always, myth and reality interact, and several medieval women took these saints as their models. The example that first comes to mind here is Joan of Arc." Likewise, numerous legends and tales from Medieval Europe (and, likewise, elsewhere in the world) discuss transvestism and sex change (often miraculous). Folklorist Stith Thompson documents only a few traditional "sex tests" for unmasking men dressed as women, but numerous tests for women, ranging from placing a spinning wheel nearby to scattering peas on the ground to cause women to slip but not men. The latter example is well known from Grimm's Fairy Tales, but can also be found in William Shakespeare's As You Like It, and the trick is even attributed to as far back as King Solomon.

Despite these examples, female cross-dressers in Europe were little accepted. The only known case of accepted female gender inversion in Medieval Europe comes from the Balkans, and extends back as far as the 15th century, as noted by a mention in the Kanun (local Ottoman law). These women could escape the very rigid social rules by declaring themselves sworn virgins, and would dress as men, live as men, and share the same status as them. Families without male heirs could even declare their infant daughters to be men and rear them as boys. Such a tradition did not exist elsewhere in Europe at the time. Dr. Carleton S. Coon noted the same custom among the mountaineers of Albania, and that under certain circumstances a woman dressing as a man becomes the head of the family and assumes a completely male role.

The history of same-sex relations between women in medieval and early modern Europe is exceedingly difficult to study, but there can be no doubt of its existence. Church leaders worried about lesbian sex; women expressed, practiced, and were sometimes imprisoned or even executed for same-sex love; and some women cross-dressed in order to live with other women as married couples." They go on to note that even the seemingly modern word "lesbian" has been traced back as far as 1732, and discuss lesbian subcultures, but add, "Nevertheless, we certainly should not equate the single state with lesbian practices." While same-sex relationships among men were highly documented and condemned, "Moral theologians did not pay much attention to the question of what we would today call lesbian sex, perhaps because anything that did not involve a phallus did not fall within the bounds of their understanding of the sexual ... Some legislation against lesbian relations can be adduced for the period ... mainly involving the use of 'instruments', in other words, dildoes." Crane agrees, commenting on a "penitential doctrine that conceived homoerotic acts but not homosexual identity ... Discourses of sexuality such as fine amor and mystical marriage with God may be less visible now than penitential doctrine, but their effects on subjectivity deserve the greater efforts of recovery."

Historical perspective

During and immediately following her life, perspectives on Joan varied widely, often (although not always) along factional lines. Rumors of a woman leading an opposing army was historically used to incite troops against the obvious heresy, sorcery, and immorality. Comments from English soldiers at the time concerning Joan range from referring to her as a "bloody tart" to asking "whether she expected [her soldiers] to surrender to a woman" and referring to her troops as "unbelieving pimps". The English author of The Brut claimed that her troops followed her by "crafte of sorcerie". After his defeat at Orleans, Bedford reported to the English crown that his men had been bewitched by a satanic agent in the form of a woman dressed as a man. Crane notes that the English and their French Burgundian allies referred to her as a "monstrous woman, disorderly and notorious woman who dresses in men's clothes, whose conduct is dissolute".

On the other side of the English Channel, the situation was largely reversed. From the beginning, for whatever reason, there was surprisingly little hesitation on the side of the French. Of special note was the loyalty given to her by her soldiers, who were among the most skilled in France. The Bourgeois of Paris claimed that this was because, "all who disobeyed her should be killed without mercy", but the author of the  noted that "All regarded her with much affection, men and women, as well as small children." Jean de Macon, an eyewitness to the siege of Orleans, noted that there was only one act of derision, while the Cronique de Lorraine added that "All the army promised to always obey her. Each victory motivated more loyalty and further victory. Even disobedience to her higher command seems to have invited loyalty; she brought action and victory, while the older, noble generals achieved nothing but inaction and defeat."

These viewpoints tended to extend to her trials: first the Condemnation trial by the pro-English Burgundians, and later the rehabilitation trial under a commission appointed by Pope Calixtus III and organized by Charles VII. As Pinzino notes, "The pro-English [Burgundian] party into whose hands Joan fell in 1430, over a year after her role in the vital French victory at Orleans, worked to defame her self-asserted divine calling and executed her at age nineteen in the marketplace of Rouen in 1431. In the years following, however, political power in France permanently reverted to the pro-French [Armagnac] party of Joan's supporters. Promptly after Normandy and the city of Rouen itself had been restored to the French (1449) and the ecclesiastical archives there were retrieved and opened, the proceedings to nullify Joan of Arc's condemnation were undertaken by her supporters ... these proceedings were virtually unprecedented in ecclesiastical judicial history."

The Condemnation trial found Joan's transvestism condemning. The primary cross-dressing charge, that Joan dressed entirely as a man "save Nature's own distinctive marks", was designed to evade Aquinas's exceptions on cross dressing—as Raoul Le Sauvage phrased it, to "escape violence and keep one's virginity", was predicated on total disguise and passing. Joan never attempted to "pass", but simply wore the attire of men, thus giving the English cause to condemn her for the act.

After the recapture of Rouen, the site of Joan's trial, Charles VII (who owed his crown to Joan and had supported her as he believed her to be divinely inspired) dispatched a letter on 15 February 1450 which ordered the creation of a commission to reexamine the Condemnation trial, under the leadership of Guillaume d'Estouteville, Charles's cousin. As Pernoud and Clin note, "That trial was now a symbol of complex cultural fissures in search of closure: of the internal fractures of a riven France, of national splits enervated by English invasion, and of religious and civil power struggles sustained by the University of Paris." The rehabilitation trial focused strongly on the transvestism charge, which Pope Pius II noted was problematic. Individuals testifying during the trial stressed the necessity of her dress, both for means of keeping order in her troops in battle and for protecting her chastity. As the trial noted, she wore "long, conjoined hosen, attached to the aforesaid doublet with twenty cords (aiguillettes)" and "tight leggings", with the cords being used to securely tie the parts of the garment together so her clothing couldn't be pulled off by her English guards. Guillaume Manchon testified, "And she was then dressed in male clothing, and was complaining that she could not give it up, fearing lest in the night her guards would inflict some act of [sexual] outrage upon her", a claim backed up by a number of other witnesses. The same justification was given for her relapse by a number of witnesses, such as Friar Martin Ladvenu, Pierre Cusquel, Giullaume Manchon, and Friar Isambart de la Pierre, although a number of others, such as Jean Massieu, Pierre Daron, and Guillaume Colles, alternatively claimed that she was entrapped into wearing male clothing by a guard who took away her female clothing. Jean Moreau testified that he had heard Joan reply to the preacher that she had adopted male clothing during her campaign because she had to live among soldiers, among whom it was more appropriate for her to be in male, rather than female clothing. The court ruled that "nothing improper has been found in her, only good humility, chastity, piety, propriety, simplicity."

These viewpoints remained the dominant perspective on Joan's crossdressing up until the modern age. As Régine Pernoud comments in the foreword to Joan of Arc, serious books about her in any language "numbered only a few dozen". Likewise, the lack of modern acceptance of and knowledge about gender identity and sexuality further limited discourse on the subject.

Modern perspective
One of the first modern writers to raise issues of gender identity and sexuality was novelist Vita Sackville-West. In "Saint Joan of Arc", published in 1936, she indirectly suggests that Joan of Arc may have been a lesbian due to sharing a bed with little girls and women.

Rebuttals were forthcoming and are widely mentioned. The most prominent rebuttal refers to the common medieval practice of women sharing beds with one another; bed sharing had no connotations in regard to sexuality. Bonnie Wheeler of the International Joan of Arc Society called the book "dead wrong but fun".

Pernoud credits Joan's clothing to necessity and her belief that it was ordained by God. Among other things, Pernoud cites large amounts of testimony, including Guillaume Manchon from the Rehabilitation trial: "at that time, she was dressed in male clothing, and kept complaining that she could not do without it, fearing that the guards would violate her in the night; and once or twice she had complained to the Bishop of Beauvais, the Vice-Inquisitor, and Master Nicholas Loiseleur that one of the guards had attempted to rape her."

Warner argues that in pre-industrial Europe, a link existed between transvestism and priestly functions, hence justifying the historical interpretation of her as both a witch and a saint. Warner further argues for Joan as not occupying either a male or female gender. "Through her transvestism, she abrogated the destiny of womankind. She could thereby transcend her sex. ... At the same time, by never pretending to be other than a woman and a maid, she was usurping a man's function but shaking off the trammels of his sex altogether to occupy a different, third order, neither male nor female". Warner categorizes Joan as an androgyne.

According to Bouzy, Quicherat's work forms the basis of most modern scholarship on Joan, but has been discovered to contain a number of errors, selective editing, and use of "originals" that were often highly edited or manipulated versions of earlier documents. Relevant to Joan's crossdressing is Jacques Gelu's treatise, one of the theological treatise ordered by Charles VII for her rehabilitation. Quicherat criticized the text as "uninstructive hodgepodge", and, according to him, "made it considerably shorter, taking out parts of the passages where points of religious dogma are discussed". As Bouzy, a member of the Centre working on the project notes, "This text has hardly ever been consulted by historians, although it provides interesting evidence for the way the fifteenth-century church perceived Joan. The text stresses the problem of Joan's cross dressing – this shows that in 1429, even the prelates who supported Charles VII were reluctant to accept a young girl dressed as a man. Apparently, Charles VII decided in favor of Joan only because his confessor, Gérard Machet, was convinced that Joan was the girl whose coming had been announced in a prophecy by Marie Robine, a hermit from Avignon; and even then, Charles required that she be thoroughly examined. Several other treatises that have never been translated (apart from Gerson's tract) are likely to hold surprises for us as well."

Steven Weiskopf begins Secrecy, Specularity, and Speculation with the Bourgeois of Paris's recording of Joan's death, where he describes her being burned to death, then the removal of her clothes to show the audience that she was indeed female ("to take away any doubts from peoples' minds"), and the burning of the rest of her body. Weiskoph states, "What 'doubt' haunts the crowd in the Bourgeois's description? And what secrets in this quasi-pornographic account are the spectators hoping to discover ... Anne Llewellyn Barstow offers the most literal explanation, linking the Bourgeois's morbid description to the crowd's fascination with and confusion over Joan's sexual identity. Troubled by the notion that a woman could be 'a powerful war leader', both friend and foe 'thirsted to know whether she was a man or a woman'. Barstow's reading of the crowd's confusion over Joan's sexuality is neither the feminine or the masculine pronoun, the Bourgeois writes quizzically of Joan, 'What it was, God only knows.' Linked solely to her sexual identity or not, much of this uncertainty about how to interpret Joan remains."
In the Journal of Modern and Medieval Studies, Crane writes, "Isolating transvestism from sexual identity risks assuming both that heterosexuality is the only possible position for Joan and that self-presentation has nothing to do with sexuality – that sexuality is innate and prior to choices of gendered behavior." Crane argues that "an intensified relation to the law produces not her acquiescence in self-correction but instead her persistent effort to distinguish herself from the category of womanhood as she understands it." She notes Joan's repeated justification of her attire that it "pleases God that I wear it" (etc.), dodges a question on whether she would liked to have been male, and comments that the argument that her defenders at the Rehabilitation trial used – male clothing as a protection against rape – does not stand up when considering how she kept herself identifiably female, slept naked both in field and prison, and given large amounts of Joan's own commentary. Crane backs up the distinction between Joan and the holy transvestites, in that Joan lays claim to her virginity and her womanhood instead of burying it, identifying herself not with the traditional religious crossdressers – as Bynum notes, "as brides, as pregnant virgins, as housewives, as mothers of God"—but as a fighter. "Her continued engagement in secular affairs and her noninstrumental, secular cross-dressing queer her virginity – that is, they move her virginity beyond its canonical meanings in ways that suggest a revision of heterosexual identity."

In her book, Transgender Warriors: Making History From Joan of Arc to Dennis Rodman, transgender author Leslie Feinberg popularized the notion of Joan of Arc being transgender. Under the heading They Called Her 'Hommasse, Feinberg cites Evans and Murray on the "enormous importance" of Joan's male costume to her identity, and states, "Joan of Arc suffered the excruciating pain of being burned alive rather than renounce her identity ... What an inspirational role model – a brilliant transgender peasant teenager leading an army of laborers into battle." In Evolution's Rainbow: Diversity, Gender, and Sexuality in Nature and People, transgender biologist Joan Roughgarden cites and agrees with Feinberg's assessment, describing Joan as a "male-identified trans person". Leslie Feinberg argues in Transgender Liberation that "Joan of Arc was burned at the stake by the Inquisition of the Catholic church because she refused to stop dressing as a man." According to Feinberg, "she was a transvestite – an expression of her identity she was willing to die for rather than renounce." Feinberg criticises that "[m]any historians and academicians have seen Joan's transvestism as inconsequential. In the verbatim proceedings of her interrogation, however, the court records show that Joan's judges found her transvestism repugnant and demanded that she wear women's clothing. Joan of Arc's testimony in her own defense revealed how deeply her transvestism was rooted in her identity. She vowed, 'For nothing in the world will I swear not to arm myself and put on a man's dress.

Notes

Female wartime cross-dressers
Cross-dressing
Historical revisionism
 Cross-Dressing, Sexuality, And Gender Identity
Sexuality of individuals